The R630 road is a regional road in southeast County Cork, Ireland. It travels from the R907 road at Midleton's Youghal Road, southwards through Ballinacurra and westwards through Rostellan, and turning south again through Whitegate. The statutary definition gives it as beginning at the R629 in Ballinacurra, but all maps and other material assign the Midleton–Ballinacurra stretch to the R630.

References

Regional roads in the Republic of Ireland
Roads in County Cork